Abatte is both a surname and a given name. Notable people with the name include:

Julio César Abatte, Argentine footballer
Abatte Barihun (born 1967), Israeli jazz saxophonist and composer

See also
Abate (disambiguation)
Abbate